Dainius Kreivys (born 8 April 1970 in Jonava) is a Lithuanian businessman and politician who served as the Minister of Economy of Lithuania from 2008 to 2011 and is a member of Seimas since 2012. He is a member of the conservative political party Homeland Union – Lithuanian Christian Democrats.

On 7 December 2020, he was approved to be the Minister of Energy in the Šimonytė Cabinet.

Conflict of interest judgements, resignation, ongoing influence-peddling case, fresh allegations 
In 2011 Kreivys resigned as minister of the economy following public comment from President Grybauskaitė that he had lost confidence due to conflict of interest following inquiries by European Anti-Fraud Office (OLAF) and Chief Official Ethics Commission of Lithuania for approving European Union (EU) funding for a nation-wide school renovation program benefiting business interests of his immediate family. While minister Kreivys granted 6 million litas (~1.74 million euros) of EU funding to a company formally owned by his mother but was controlled by Kreivys directly immediately before and after his ministerial assignment.  

Official Ethics Commission stated in its findings, among other points, that Kreivys failed to conform to the law requiring public servants to declare their private interests in a timely manner and supplied incorrect data pertaining to a possible conflict of interest. Kreivys attempted to sue the Chief Official Ethics Commission and lost.
Kreivys was subsequently also found guilty of a conflict of interest in 2013 by the OLAF for formally transferring his business interests to his mother, granting her EU funding thanks to his position as minister of the economy and, after leaving the ministerial post, formally re-acquiring the business interests from her. OLAF demanded Lithuanian government return the funding granted (the funding was never returned by the Kreivys family companies); commented that the public procurement tender by Municipality of Vilnius won by Kreivienė's company was also unlawful; and commented that the person who chose the tender winner later became Kreivys' ministerial advisor.

Kreivys was also implicated in alleged influence peddling while minister of the economy on behalf of BOD Group, a solar energy business, which resulted in 14 million euros in EU funding for the company in 2009. The matter was still being decided by the prosecutor general as late as 2020.

In 2011, after Kreivys left his ministerial assignment, his mother's businesses were granted 1 million litas (289,620 euros) of EU funding for training purposes by two other conservative government ministers, in an alleged conflict of interest.

In 2017, Kreivys was noted to have been spending his parliamentary vehicle allowance renting a car from a company owned by himself.

In 2018, Kreivys companies were noted to have used creative accounting to maximize their benefit from Lithuania’s solar power subsidies, taking advantage of a loophole capping subsidies per company but not per ultimate beneficiary.

In 2020, a Kreivys company was convicted of construction based on an unlawful permit in Vilnius and would have had to demolish the building; however it signed a peace agreement with the Municipality of Vilnius and was spared. The company built apartments instead of a public building with social apartments for low-income citizens on its upper floors. Before becoming minister again in 2020, Kreivys' potential conflicts of interest were the main topic of discussion with President Nausėda.

In 2022 Kreivys’ spouse, Dalia Kreivienė, was nominated by the cabinet (of which Kreivys was a member) for the position of the ambassador to Italy. This again raised concerns about a potential conflict of interest.

Motion of no confidence 
In September 2022 Kreivys was subject to an interpellation (motion of no confidence) by the Seimas, in spite of the governing coalition having parliamentary majority.

Family wealth 
Kreivys and his wife (director of external economic policy at Ministry of Foreign Affairs of Lithuania) were ranked as 4th and 5th wealthiest politicians & public servants in 2020. Kreivys' mother Florentina Kreivienė was ranked as the 5th wealthiest woman in Lithuania in 2011 with a net worth of more than 49 million euros.

Religion 

In 2009 Kreivys was revealed as member of Opus Dei together with Rokas Masiulis and other Lithuanian elites. Many of Kreivys professional collaborators are also members of the Christian society.

References

 Dainius Kreivys (Minister of Economy). Government of the Republic of Lithuania.

1970 births
Ministers of Economy of Lithuania
Living people
Politicians from Jonava
Homeland Union politicians
Members of the Seimas
21st-century Lithuanian politicians
Ministers of Energy of Lithuania
Lithuanian University of Educational Sciences alumni